Rachot Kanjanavanit (5 August 1924 – 1996) was a Thai civil engineer. He was a professor at the Faculty of Engineering of Chulalongkorn University, and served as president of the Engineering Institute of Thailand. His firm, R.K.V. Engineering Consultant, was responsible for the construction of the MBK Center shopping mall, Central Chidlom department store, the factory of Siam City Cement, and Map Ta Phut Industrial Port. He was also a sailor, and competed at the 1964 Summer Olympics, the 1968 Summer Olympics, and the 1972 Summer Olympics.

References

External links
 

1924 births
1990s deaths
Rachot Kanjanavanit
Rachot Kanjanavanit
Rachot Kanjanavanit
Rachot Kanjanavanit
Sailors at the 1964 Summer Olympics – Finn
Sailors at the 1968 Summer Olympics – Finn
Sailors at the 1972 Summer Olympics – Finn
Rachot Kanjanavanit
Asian Games medalists in sailing
Sailors at the 1970 Asian Games
Medalists at the 1970 Asian Games
Rachot Kanjanavanit
20th-century engineers